The 1992–93 season was Port Vale's 81st season of football in the English Football League, and fourth successive (36th overall) season in the Second Division. John Rudge found new stars by bringing both Ian Taylor and Paul Musselwhite to the club at a combined fee of just £40,000. His team won the pre-season TNT Tournament, and also won the Football League Trophy. In the league Vale reached third place, four points off their rivals Stoke City, who lifted the title. They reached the play-off final, but lost out 3–0 to West Bromwich Albion. They left the FA Cup and the League Cup at the Third Round and First Round stages respectively. They played five Potteries derby games, winning the League Trophy clash and the FA Cup clash after a replay, but losing both encounters in the league.

Overview

Second Division
The pre-season saw Vale tour the Netherlands and participate in a TNT Tournament. Beating De Graafschap 5–0, van der Laan scoring a brace, they then lost 4–3 to the Go Ahead Eagles on penalties, following a goalless draw. Despite this they were crowned the tournament's winners on aggregate. John Rudge uncovered another 'gem' by signing midfielder Ian Taylor from non-league Moor Green for a fee of just £15,000. He also spent a mere £25,000 to bring Scunthorpe United goalkeeper Paul Musselwhite to Vale Park. Musslewhite's arrival came due to the departure of Mark Grew to Cardiff City. Paul Kerr also arrived in Burslem from Millwall for a £140,000 fee. Another new face was defender Bradley Sandeman, who arrived on a free transfer from Maidstone United.

The season  started poorly, with the Vale picking up just one win in the opening eight games. On 5 September, Trevor Wood conceded a penalty at Vetch Field in an 'off the ball' incident with a Swansea player and was subsequently dropped in favour of Musselwhite, who remained an ever present in the Vale side for the rest of the season. From 12 September to 13 February they went on a club-record streak of 22 games without failing to score – losing just two games in the process (one of these being a 2–1 defeat to Stoke City at the Victoria Ground). Overlapping this spell, from 1 January to 14 March they went on a club-record six straight home defeats. This in turn was followed by two further club-records, as between 20 March and 24 April they made five consecutive away wins, picking up clean sheets in all five games. In January, Dean Stokes was signed from non-league Halesowen Town for £5,000. The next month Peter Billing arrived on loan from Coventry City, and impressed enough to earn a permanent move three months later, at a fee of £35,000. Alex Mathie also arrived on loan from Greenock Morton, but failed to make an impact. They won four of their final five games, but this was not enough to gain them a promotion place, as Bolton won fifteen of their final eighteen games.

They finished in third place with 89 points, one point short of promoted Bolton Wanderers and four points behind rivals Stoke City. Their two draws with Bolton and two defeats to Stoke proved fatal. They were a massive seventeen points clear of seventh place Leyton Orient, and so went into the play-offs. Facing the foes of their League Trophy Final success, Stockport County, in the semi-finals, Vale drew 1–1 at Edgeley Park thanks to a Dean Glover goal. They won the return leg in front of 12,689 fans with a Martin Foyle goal. In the final were the side that had knocked them out the FA Cup semi-finals in 1954, West Bromwich Albion. The game was goalless until Peter Swan was dismissed for bringing down an advancing Bob Taylor. They tasted defeat at Wembley for the first time as a crowd of 53,471 witnessed three subsequent West Brom goals, scored by Andy Hunt, Nicky Reid, and Kevin Donovan.

Player of the Year Ian Taylor, top-scorer with nineteen goals, was also picked for the PFA Second Division Team of the Year.

Finances
The club's shirt sponsors were Tunstall Assurance.

Cup competitions
In the FA Cup, Vale were drawn against Stoke City. After a goalless draw at the Victoria Ground, some 19,810 turned up to see the replay at Vale Park. A 3–1 victory followed, with a Foyle brace and a third from Andy Porter; the game was best remembered for a patch of mud however, which stopped a certain goal from Dave Regis which would have levelled the score at 2–2. The "Valiants" then easily dispatched non-league Altrincham with a 4–1 win at Moss Lane. Drawn against First Division Newcastle United at St James' Park in the Third Round, Vale were brushed aside 4–0 by the "Magpies".

In the League Cup, Vale faced a tricky encounter with league rivals Bolton Wanderers. Losing 2–1 at Burnden Park, a 1–1 draw in Burslem meant the "Trotters" advanced at the expense of the Vale.

In the League Trophy, Vale overcame Fulham with a 4–3 victory, despite going behind in extra time, Glover bagging a brace. They then faced Third Division Northampton Town, who they dispatched with a 4–2 win. Facing Stoke City once again in the Southern Section semi-finals, Robin van der Laan scored the only goal of the game at the Victoria Ground to take Vale into the Southern Area final. They advanced past Exeter City with a 2–1 home win and a 1–1 draw at St James Park, with Slaven scoring the crucial third goal of the aggregate tie with 13 minutes left to play. The league was the priority, yet Vale had made it into the League Trophy Final. Stockport County were out for revenge after Vale had edged them out of the play-offs. Paul Kerr put the Vale ahead, before Bernie Slaven made it two before half-time. Giant striker Kevin Francis pulled one back but Vale held on for the win.

League table

Results
Port Vale's score comes first

Football League Second Division

Results by matchday

Matches

Football League Second Division play-offs

FA Cup

League Cup

League Trophy

Player statistics

Appearances

Top scorers

Transfers

Transfers in

Transfers out

Loans in

References
Specific

General

Port Vale F.C. seasons
Port Vale